Carabus melancholicus submeridionalis is a species of beetle in the family Carabidae that can be found in Portugal and Spain. They are brownish-black coloured.

References

melancholicus submeridionalis
Beetles described in 1975